Rafe Esquith is an American teacher who taught at Hobart Boulevard Elementary School, in Los Angeles, California, from 1984 until his resignation in 2015. Many of his students, who were all from a community of poor and immigrant families, started class very early, left late, and typically achieved high scores in standardized tests. Esquith has authored books about teaching and his annual class Shakespeare productions were featured in the 2005 documentary The Hobart Shakespeareans.

His teaching honors include the 1992 Teacher of the Year, for The Walt Disney Company's American Teacher Awards, a Fellowship from Johns Hopkins University, Oprah Winfrey’s $100,000 "Use Your Life Award", Parents Magazine’s "As You Grow Award", National Medal of Arts, and Esquith was made an honorary Member of the Order of the British Empire.

Life and career
A 1981 graduate of UCLA, Esquith began teaching in 1982 at Ivanhoe Elementary School.  Two years later, he moved to Hobart, the second-largest elementary school in the United States. Most of the school's 850 students come from Central American and Korean families. According to a 2005 report on National Public Radio, 90 percent of his students were living below the poverty level, and all were from immigrant families, with none speaking English as a first language.

The dynamic agenda and intensive curriculum that Esquith had previously applied at Ivanhoe proved to be challenging for his pupils at Hobart. Thus, Esquith was resolved to prove that the students of Hobart were no less capable than those anywhere else, but rather their expectations had not been set high enough.

Esquith's fifth-grade students consistently score in the top 5 to 10 percent of the country in standardized tests. Many of Esquith's students voluntarily start class at 6:30 each morning, two hours before the rest of the school's students.  They volunteer to come early, work through recess, stay as late as 6:00 pm, and come to class during vacations and holidays.

Each April, Esquith’s students perform one of Shakespeare's plays as The Hobart Shakespeareans.  They have opened for the Royal Shakespeare Company, have appeared at the Globe Theater in London, were hired by Sir Peter Hall to perform A Midsummer Night's Dream at the Ahmanson Theatre in Los Angeles, and were the subjects of the 2005 documentary The Hobart Shakespeareans.

Controversy
In March 2015 Esquith was placed on leave pending an LAUSD investigation into allegations of misconduct in his classroom. In June Esquith's lawyer Mark Geragos filed a formal complaint against the district, a precursor to a lawsuit. Geragos says that while the district has not clearly outlined the allegations against Esquith, after an "'initial' investigation was found to be meritless, LAUSD has taken it upon itself to manufacture new ways to attempt to defame Mr. Esquith.” LAUSD superintendent Ramon Cortines has said "there are serious issues that go beyond the initial investigation." LAUSD later revealed that the investigation had been expanded to include the unsubstantiated allegations of sexual abuse of a student in the 1970s who was 8 or 9 at the time, when Esquith was a teenager and employed with an afterschool program at Westside Jewish Community Center. The alleged victim said he did not report the abuse to LAUSD until 2006, and the district then reported them to LAPD. No charges were filed at the time. In October 2015 the school board voted unanimously to fire Esquith.  Documents later obtained by the Los Angeles Times via the California Public Records Act included documentation of email communications with students deemed inappropriate by LAUSD. Soon after Esquith filed a $1 billion class-action lawsuit against the LAUSD on behalf of 2,000 teachers. The lawsuit came after multiple allegations claiming the school district had fired teachers on the brink of retirement in order to save money on retirement benefits. In September 2017 the Los Angeles Unified School District settled the lawsuits with Esquith for an undisclosed sum. As part of the settlement it was agreed that Esquith would receive lifetime health benefits and the satisfaction that the settlement included language intended to better protect the rights of teachers accused of wrongdoing. The settlement went on to state that, "Mr. Esquith has tendered his resignation, effective October 31, 2015, and L.A. Unified has retroactively accepted it."

Books
There Are No Shortcuts (2003)   – published in 2003, this book is a required reading for EDCI 205 (Exploring Teaching as a Career) at Purdue University.
Teach Like Your Hair's on Fire (2007)  
Lighting Their Fires: Raising Extraordinary Children in a Mixed-up, Muddled-up, Shook-up World (2009) – a slim (208-page) book is addressed to parents but organized around a class trip to Dodger Stadium, with sections revolving around concepts including Punctuality, Focus, Decision Making, Taking Pride in What You Do, Selflessness, Humility, Patience, and Teaching Kids to Grow.
 Real Talk for Real Teachers: Advice for Teachers from Rookies to Veterans: "No Retreat, No Surrender!" (2013)

References

External links

 The Hobart Shakespeareans Official Website

News Articles
 Washington Post "Better Teachers, Not Tinier Classes, Should Be Goal" 2Mar2009
 NPR "Rafe Esquith Offers His Fiery Teaching Methods" 22Jan2007
 NPR "Inner-City Teacher Takes No Shortcuts to Success" 26Apr2005

Year of birth missing (living people)
Living people
American education writers
Members of the Order of the British Empire
Writers from Los Angeles
University of California, Los Angeles alumni
United States National Medal of Arts recipients
American male non-fiction writers
Schoolteachers from California
21st-century American non-fiction writers
21st-century American male writers